The Party of Democratic Kampuchea was a political party in Cambodia, formed as a continuation of the Communist Party of Kampuchea in December 1981. In the mid-1980s, it publicly claimed that its ideology was "a new form of democratic socialism", having ostensibly renounced Marxism–Leninism.

History 
According to the party itself, the dissolution of the CPK and formation of the PDK was prompted by the need for broader unity against Vietnam, a unity which an explicit communist line would hamper. The National Army of Democratic Kampuchea was the armed wing of the party, while the Patriotic and Democratic Front of the Great National Union of Kampuchea was a mass organization controlled by it.

The General Secretary of the party at the time was Pol Pot. The party led the deposed Democratic Kampuchea government. Its followers were generally called Khmer Rouge.

At the time of the formation of the PDK, the Khmer Rouge forces had been pushed back by the Vietnamese-backed KPRP government to an area near the Thai border. The PDK began cooperating with other anti-Vietnamese factions, and formed the Coalition Government of Democratic Kampuchea in 1982.

Although Pol Pot relinquished party leadership to Khieu Samphan in 1985, he continued to wield considerable influence over the movement.

Ahead of the 1992/1993 elections, the PDK was largely succeeded by the Cambodian National Unity Party (CNUP), which publicly stated its wish to participate in the elections but eventually did not register and vowed to sabotage the election. Subsequently, UNTAC decided not to conduct elections in areas under PDK control. At the time it was estimated that approximately six percent of the population in Cambodia lived in areas under PDK control.

The PDK was declared illegal in July 1994, after which its activities continued under the Cambodian National Unity Party and the self-proclaimed Provisional Government of National Union and National Salvation of Cambodia.

See also 
 Coalition Government of Democratic Kampuchea
 Phnom Malai

References 

1981 establishments in Cambodia
1993 disestablishments in Cambodia
Banned communist parties
Defunct political parties in Cambodia
Khmer Rouge
Organizations of the Third Indochina War
Political parties disestablished in 1993
Political parties established in 1981
Rebel groups in Cambodia
Socialist parties in Cambodia